A pastebin or text storage site is a type of online content-hosting service where users can store plain text (e.g. source code snippets for code review via Internet Relay Chat (IRC)). The first pastebin was the eponymous pastebin.com. Other sites with the same functionality have appeared, and several open source pastebin scripts are available. Pastebins may allow commenting where readers can post feedback directly on the page. GitHub Gists are a type of pastebin with version control.

History
Pastebins developed in the late 1990s to facilitate IRC chatrooms devoted to computing, where users naturally needed to share large blocks of computer input or output in a line-oriented medium. On such IRC channels, where the formatting clues are subtle and several conversations can be closely interleaved, blocks of computer data flood the queue, disrupting the intricate flow. A reference to a pastebin entry, however, is a one-line hyperlink. Users are often warned to instead use pastebins, or risk being banned from the service in the event of disruption.

A new class of IRC bot has evolved. In a chatroom that is largely oriented around a few pastebins, nothing more needs to be done after a post at its pastebin. The receiving party then awaits a bot to announce the expected posting by the known user.

After the use of the pastebin.pl pastebin for a data breach, Pastebin started monitoring the site for illegally pasted data and information, leading to a backlash from Anonymous. Hacktivists teamed up with an organization calling itself the People's Liberation Front, launching an alternative called AnonPaste.

See also 

 Netiquette
 Snippet (programming)
 Text file
 Wiki

References 

File sharing
File sharing services
Web applications
Web hosting
Text